Harry Lewis Woods (May 5, 1889 – December 28, 1968) was an American film actor.

Born in Cleveland, Ohio, Woods was a millinery salesman prior to becoming an actor. He appeared in nearly 250 films between 1923 and 1958. During his 35-year film career he acquired a reputation as a screen villain par excellence; his imposing size, powerful build, piercing eyes and snarling voice typed him as a bad guy to be reckoned with. He seldom played ordinary henchmen, usually cast as both the brains (the banker or saloon owner who secretly runs the bandit gang terrorizing the area) and the brawn behind the local villainy. He was well respected by his peers. Another prime screen villain, Roy Barcroft, once said of him, "Everything I know about being a bad guy I learned from Harry Woods." He enjoyed a long career in films before retiring in 1958, and he died in Los Angeles ten years later from uremia.

Personal life
His son, Harry Lewis Woods, Jr., followed in his footsteps and acted in the 1940s and 1950s as Craig Woods.

Selected filmography

 Don Quickshot of the Rio Grande (1923) - A Knight
 The Steel Trail (1923) - Morris Blake
 Battlin' Buckaroo (1924) - Buck Carson
 The Fast Express (1924) - Tom Boyd
 Wolves of the North (1924, Serial) - Bob Hunter
 Dynamite Dan (1924) - Brute Lacy
 Ten Scars Make a Man (1924) - Buck Simpson
 A Cafe in Cairo (1924) - Kali
 The Bandit's Baby (1925) - Matt Hartigan
 Fighting Courage (1925) - (uncredited)
 A Man Four-Square (1926) - Ben Taylor
 A Trip to Chinatown (1926) - Norman Blood
 30 Below Zero (1926) - Cavender
 A Regular Scout (1926) - Scar Stevens
 Cyclone of the Range (1927) - The Black Rider / Don Alvarado
 Splitting the Breeze (1927) - Dave Matlock
 Silver Comes Through (1927) - Stanton
 Tom's Gang (1927) - Bart Haywood
 Jesse James (1927) - Bob Ford
 When the Law Rides (1928) - The Raven
 Red Riders of Canada (1928) - Monsieur Le Busard
 The Sunset Legion (1928) - Honest John
 The Viking (1928) - Egil
 Tyrant of Red Gulch (1928) - Ivan Petrovitch
 The Candy Kid (1928)
 Gun Law (1929) - Bull Driscoll
 The Desert Rider (1929) - Williams
 China Bound (1929) - Officer
 The Phantom Rider (1929) - Calhound Hardy
 Neath Western Skies (1929) - Jim Canfield
 The Lone Rider (1930) - Ed Farrell
 Pardon My Gun (1930) - Cooper
 Men Without Law (1930) - Murdock
 West of Cheyenne (1931) - Kurt Raymer, aka The Laramie Kid
 The Texas Ranger (1931) - Matt Taylor
 In Old Cheyenne (1931)
 I Like Your Nerve (1931) - Cellano - Assassin (uncredited)
 Monkey Business (1931) - Briggs
 Palmy Days (1931) - Yolando's Henchman
 The Range Feud (1931) - Vandall
 Law and Order (1932) - Walt Northrup
 Sky Devils (1932) - Military Policeman (uncredited)
 Night World (1932) - Gang Leader (uncredited)
 Two Seconds (1932) - Executioner (uncredited)
 Radio Patrol (1932) - Kloskey
 I Am a Fugitive from a Chain Gang (1932) - Prison Guard (uncredited)
 Haunted Gold (1932) - Joe Ryan
 My Weakness (1933) - Gordoni (uncredited)
 The Prizefighter and the Lady (1933) - George Lyons (uncredited)
 From Headquarters (1933) - Mullins - Police Guard (uncredited)
 The World Changes (1933) - Sam (uncredited)
 Hoop-La (1933) - Side Show Troublemaker (uncredited)
 Shadows of Sing Sing (1933) - Al Rossi
 Caravan (1934) - Romeo (uncredited)
 Devil Tiger (1934) - Ramseye Doyle
 Wonder Bar (1934) - First Detective (uncredited)
 The Crosby Case (1934) - Detective Logan (uncredited)
 Journal of a Crime (1934) - Detective with Inspector (uncredited)
 School for Girls (1934) - Detective
 I Believed in You (1934) - State Trooper (uncredited)
 The Scarlet Empress (1934) - Doctor #1 (uncredited)
 The Circus Clown (1934) - Ajax
 Belle of the Nineties (1934) - Slade
 The St. Louis Kid (1934) - Louie Munn
 The President Vanishes (1934) - James Kramer
 Rustlers of Red Dog (1935, Serial) - 'Rocky'
 When a Man's a Man (1935) - Nick Gambert
 The Call of the Savage (1935, Serial) - Borno
 Let 'Em Have It (1935) - Big Bill
 Silk Hat Kid (1935) - Salesman (uncredited)
 Dante's Inferno (1935) - Reynolds - Second Officer (uncredited)
 The Adventures of Rex and Rinty (1935, Serial) - Crawford
 Call of the Wild (1935) - Soapy Smith (uncredited)
 Heir to Trouble (1935) - Honest John Motley
 Stormy (1935) - Mack - Red Wing's Owner (uncredited)
 Remember Last Night? (1935) - Station Agent (uncredited)
 Ship Cafe (1935) - Donovan (uncredited)
 Gallant Defender (1935) - Barr Munro
 Lawless Riders (1935) - Bart
 Rose of the Rancho (1936) - Bull Bangle
 It Had to Happen (1936) - Workman (uncredited)
 The Lawless Nineties (1936) - Charles K. Plummer
 The Robin Hood of El Dorado (1936) - Pete
 Silly Billies (1936) - Hank Bewley
 Heroes of the Range (1936) - Bull Lamton
 Human Cargo (1936) - Ira Conklin
 The Last Outlaw (1936) - Traffic Policeman (uncredited)
 Ticket to Paradise (1936) - John Dawson
 The Phantom Rider (1936, Serial) - Harvey Delaney
 The Unknown Ranger (1936) - Vance Rand
 The Plainsman (1936) - Quartermaster Sergeant
 Conflict (1936) - 'Ruffhouse' Kelly
 Criminal Lawyer (1937) - Police Inspector Burke (uncredited)
 Outcast (1937) - Grant - Head Lyncher
 Land Beyond the Law (1937) - Tascosa
 I Promise to Pay (1937) - Henchman Fats
 Reckless Ranger (1937) - Barlowe
 Border Cafe (1937) - Ranger Bert (uncredited)
 The Last Train from Madrid (1937) - Government Man (uncredited)
 Range Defenders (1937) - John Harvey
 The Emperor's Candlesticks (1937) - Capt. Demisoff (uncredited)
 The Singing Marine (1937) - First Marine Sergeant
 Big City (1937) - Detective Miller (uncredited)
 Ali Baba Goes to Town (1937) - Officer (uncredited)
 Stand-In (1937) - Studio Employee (uncredited)
 Thoroughbreds Don't Cry (1937) - Racetrack Guard (uncredited)
 Courage of the West (1937) - Al Wilkins, aka Jed Newman
 The Singing Outlaw (1937) - Leonard Cueball Qualey
 Wells Fargo (1937) - Timekeeper (uncredited)
 The Buccaneer (1938) - American Sergeant (uncredited)
 The Spy Ring (1938) - Capt. Holden
 Hawaiian Buckaroo (1938) - J. P. M'Tigue
 Rolling Caravans (1938) - Thad Dalton
 Joy of Living (1938) - Cop (uncredited)
 Stagecoach Days (1938) - Moose Ringo
 Panamint's Bad Man (1938) - Craven
 Men with Wings (1938) - Baker (uncredited)
 The Texans (1938) - Cavalry Officer (uncredited)
 Block-Heads (1938) - Belligerent Neighbor (uncredited)
 Crime Takes a Holiday (1938) - Stoddard
 In Early Arizona (1938) - Bull
 Come On, Rangers (1938) - Morgan Burke
 The Strange Case of Dr. Meade (1938) - Harper
 The Arizona Wildcat (1939) - Ross Harper
 Mr. Moto in Danger Island (1939) - Grant
 Union Pacific (1939) - Al Brett
 Blue Montana Skies (1939) - Jim Hendricks
 In Old Caliente (1939) - Curly Calkins
 The Man in the Iron Mask (1939) - First Officer
 Beau Geste (1939) - Renoir
 Frontier Marshal (1939) - Curly Bill's Henchman (uncredited)
 Days of Jesse James (1939) - Captain Worthington
 West of Carson City (1940) - Mack Gorman
 The House of the Seven Gables (1940) - Mr. Wainwright (uncredited)
 Boss of Bullion City (1940) - Sheriff Jeff Salters
 Isle of Destiny (1940) - Capt. Lawson
 Dark Command (1940) - Man in Fight with Seton (uncredited)
 Bullet Code (1940) - Cass Barton
 Winners of the West (1940, Serial) - King Carter
 South of Pago Pago (1940) - Black Mike Rafferty
 The Ranger and the Lady (1940) - Kincaid
 Triple Justice (1940) - Deputy Al Reeves
 The Long Voyage Home (1940) - Amindra First Mate (uncredited)
 Meet the Missus (1940) - Elmer Shillingford
 Petticoat Politics (1941) - Guy Markwell
 The Lady from Cheyenne (1941) - Assessor Mitch Harrigan (uncredited)
 Sheriff of Tombstone (1941) - Shotgun Cassidy
 Last of the Duanes (1941) - Sheriff Red Morgan
 Today I Hang (1942) - Henry Courtney
 Wild Bill Hickok Rides (1942) - Bixby - First Train Robber (uncredited)
 Reap the Wild Wind (1942) - Mace
 The Spoilers (1942) - Disgruntled Miner (uncredited)
 Romance on the Range (1942) - Steve
 Down Texas Way (1942) - Bert Logan
 Jackass Mail (1942) - Ranch Owner to Hang Baggot (uncredited)
 Riders of the West (1942) - Duke Mason
 Deep in the Heart of Texas (1942) - Sergeant Idaho
 West of the Law (1942) - Jim Rand
 The Forest Rangers (1942) - Lumberman (uncredited)
 Dawn on the Great Divide (1942) - Jim Corkle
 Sherlock Holmes and the Secret Weapon (1942) - Kurt (uncredited)
 The Ghost Rider (1943) - Lash Edwards
 Cheyenne Roundup (1943) - Blackie Dawson
 Bordertown Gun Fighters (1943) - Marshal Dave Strickland
 The Masked Marvel (1943, Serial) - Lab Thug (uncredited)
 Beyond the Last Frontier (1943) - Big Bill Hadley
 Outlaws of Stampede Pass (1943) - Ben Crowley
 In Old Oklahoma (1943) - Al Dalton (uncredited)
 Ali Baba and the Forty Thieves (1944) - Mongol Guard (uncredited)
 Westward Bound (1944) - Roger Caldwell
 Marshal of Gunsmoke (1944) - Lon Curtiss
 The Impostor (1944) - Guard (uncredited)
 Slightly Terrific (1944) - Gypsy King (uncredited)
 The Adventures of Mark Twain (1944) - Bixby's Depth-Caller (uncredited)
 Call of the Rockies (1944) - J. B. Murdock
 Silver City Kid (1944) - Judge Sam H. Ballard
 Tall in the Saddle (1944) - George Clews
 Can't Help Singing (1944) - Gunman Disliking Prying (uncredited)
 Nevada (1944) - Joe Powell
 Wanderer of the Wasteland (1945) - Guerd Eliott
 Flame of the West (1945) - Wilson
 Radio Stars on Parade (1945) - Rudy Campbell (uncredited)
 West of the Pecos (1945) - Brad Sawtelle
 South of Monterey (1946) - Bennet
 Sunset Pass (1946) - Cinnabar
 My Darling Clementine (1946) - Luke (uncredited)
 Trail Street (1947) - Larkin Larkin
 Code of the West (1947) - Marshal Nate Hatfield
 Thunder Mountain (1947) - Trimble Carson
 Wyoming (1947) - Ben Jackson
 The Secret Life of Walter Mitty (1947) - Wrong Mr. Follinsbee (uncredited)
 Black Gold (1947) - Smuggler (uncredited)
 Desire Me (1947) - Joseph (scenes deleted)
 The Fabulous Texan (1947) - State Policeman (uncredited)
 Wild Horse Mesa (1947) - Jay Olmstead
 Road to Rio (1947) - Ship's Purser
 Tycoon (1947) - Holden
 Western Heritage (1948) - Arnold posing as Powell
 Silver River (1948) - Riverboat Poker Player (uncredited)
 The Gallant Legion (1948) - Lang
 A Southern Yankee (1948) - Dentist (uncredited)
 Adventures of Don Juan (1948) - Guard (uncredited)
 Indian Agent (1948) - Carter
 One Sunday Afternoon (1948) - Matt Hughes - Policeman (uncredited)
 South of St. Louis (1949) - Recruiting Sergeant (uncredited)
 Hellfire (1949) - Lew Stoner
 Colorado Territory (1949) - Pluthner
 The Fountainhead (1949) - Quarry Superintendent (uncredited)
 She Wore a Yellow Ribbon (1949) - Karl Rynders (uncredited)
 Masked Raiders (1949) - Marshal Barlow
 Samson and Delilah (1949) - Gammad (uncredited)
 The Traveling Saleswoman (1950) - Soap Factory Mechanic (uncredited)
 Backfire (1950) - Dick Manning - Man from Detroit (uncredited)
 Let's Dance (1950) - Police Lieutenant (uncredited)
 Short Grass (1950) - Sam Dreen
 Law of the Badlands (1951) - Burt Conroy
 Best of the Badmen (1951) - Cherokee Springs Trading Post Proprietor (uncredited)
 Lone Star (1952) - George Dellman
 Rancho Notorious (1952) - Marshal McDonald (uncredited)
 Ride the Man Down (1952) - Henchman (uncredited)
 Hell's Outpost (1954) - Deputy Lud (uncredited)
 The Last Command (1955) - Irate Texan in Cantina (uncredited)
 The Ten Commandments (1956) - Officer (uncredited)
 The Restless Breed (1957) - Frank Baker (uncredited)
 Gunsmoke TV Series (1957) - Episode "Who Lives By The Sword" as Snyder
 The Sheepman (1958) - Cattle Rancher in Restaurant (uncredited)
 Bat Masterson TV Series (1959) - Episode "Lady Luck" as Mr. Morgan
 Bat Masterson TV Series (1961) - Episode "Run For Your Money" as Doc R.W. Fleming

References

External links

 
 

1889 births
1968 deaths
American male film actors
Male actors from Cleveland
20th-century American male actors
Male Western (genre) film actors